Longquan is a county-level city and former county under the administration of the prefecture-level city of Lishui in southwestern Zhejiang Province, China, located on the upper reaches of the Ou River and bordering Fujian province to the southwest.

Called Longyuan before the Tang dynasty, Longquan adopted its current name because of the naming taboo of Emperor Gaozu, the founder of Tang whose personal name was Li Yuan.

Demographics
Longquan has a population of around 270,000.

There is an Ethnic Township set aside for the She-nation minority at Zhuyang.

Celadons and swords

Longquan is famous locally for its swords and Longquan celadon ceramics, both of which are often regarded as historically the finest in China.  Longquan celadon was one of China's finest ceramics from the Song dynasty until it fell out of fashion in the Imperial court during the Ming dynasty.  Production continued but at lower quality.  The swords made in Longquan (Longquanjian) are famous among martial artists in China. Modern sword production is now led by a workshop named "Shenguanglong" whose sword-making history can be traced back to the twentieth year of Guangxu in the Qing Dynasty. There are several private and state-owned swords-making factories in Longquan.

Industry
The city has a static inverter plant of HVDC Three Gorges-Changzhou.

Administration
The city's executive, legislature and judiciary are at Longyuan Subdistrict, together with the CPC and PSB branches. The other divisions, numbering two subdistricts, eight towns, seven townships and one ethnic township, are as follows:

Subdistricts:
Xijie Subdistrict, Jianchi Subdistrict

Towns:
Badu, Shangyang, Xiaomei, Chatian, Pingnan, Anren, Jinxi, Zhulong

Townships:
Lanju Township, Dashi Township, Baoxi Township, Longnan Township, Daotai Township, Yanzhang Township, Chengbei Township, Zhuyang She Ethnic Township

Climate

Transportation
The city is served by a station on the Quzhou–Ningde railway which opened on 27 September 2020.

References

External links
https://web.archive.org/web/20190704170412/http://www.longquan.gov.cn/

County-level cities in Zhejiang
National Forest Cities in China
Lishui